My Leopold (German:Mein Leopold) is an 1873 sentimental comedy play by the German writer Adolphe L'Arronge. It is his best known work and has been adapted into films on several occasions.

References

Bibliography
 Dennis Kennedy. The Oxford Companion to Theatre and Performance. OUP, 2010.

1873 plays
German plays adapted into films
Plays by Adolphe L'Arronge